Comptella curta is a species of sea snail, a marine gastropod mollusk in the family Muricidae, the murex snails or rock snails.

Description

Distribution
This marine species is endemic to New Zealand.

References

External links
 Image of the lectotype specimen of Comptella curta held at the Museum of New Zealand Te Papa Tongarewa

Muricidae
Gastropods of New Zealand
Gastropods described in 1905